Nung Ikot is one of the nine clans located in the Oruk Anam local government area. It is the fourth administrative area. Its inhabitants speak the Annang language.

Subdivisions
Eka Nung Ikot
Nung Ikot Asanga
Nung Ikot Obiodo
Nung Ikot Oku Usung
Nung Ikot Urua Ekpo

History

Nung Ikot is located in Oruk Anam, a region of Akwa Ibom State. The administrative area produces crude oil, palm oil, and the economy is mainly based on agriculture.

References    

Towns in Oruk Anam
Populated places in Akwa Ibom State